Axel Kjäll (born 1 June 1981) is a Swedish football manager and retired football defender.

Ahead of the 2011 season he was named manager of BK Forward. He joined the coaching team of the city's larger team Örebro SK ahead of the 2013 season.

Having both played for and later managed Örebro SK for several seasons, he became director of sports in 2021. In 2022, the club sacked manager Joel Cedergren after a single league game, and Kjäll was brought back as manager. However, he did not last throughout the entire season either. He returned to an administrative position, but in December 2022 he was hired by the Swedish Football Association as head coach of the new Swedish U15 team.

References

1981 births
Living people
Swedish footballers
Örebro SK players
Trelleborgs FF players
BK Forward players
Association football defenders
Allsvenskan players
Swedish football managers
Örebro SK managers
Allsvenskan managers
Superettan managers